Star Sirius was a UT 734-class ocean-going anchor handling tug and supply ship berthed in Lerwick, Shetland, Scotland, throughout much of the 1970s. Today it is known as the Hua Shan.

Star Sirius had an unusual career for a tug; it was attached to the Fishery Protection Squadron in the Cod War of 1975-76 between the United Kingdom and Iceland. The tug was also involved in the Shetland oil disaster in 1993, where it had a role in attempting the rescue of the tanker . The crew and ship were commended in the official report, which stated:

References

Ships of Scotland
1970s ships
Lerwick
Ships of the Fishery Protection Squadron of the United Kingdom
Auxiliary ships of the Royal Navy
History of Shetland